Port Grand Food and drink and Entertainment Complex is a  recreational area built in Karachi, Sindh, Pakistan along the waterfront of the 19th century Native Jetty Bridge that connects the Karachi Port Trust to Keamari. The project was a result of joint efforts made by the Karachi Port Trust and a private company Grand Leisure Corporation.  The complex was opened for public on 28 May 2011, with then Governor of Sindh, Ishratul Ibad inaugurating the complex. The complex is a hub of shopping, dining, cultural and coastal recreational activities in the city.

Port Grand is located on Napier Mole Bridge a site that is very significant to the history of Karachi and has played a crucial role in making it the city it is today. The project stretches along 1,000 ft of Karachi's ancient 19th century Native Jetty Bridge and spreads over an area of 200,000 sq. ft.

The one kilometer bridge has been transformed into an entertainment and food enclave housing numerous eateries totaling 40,000 sq. ft of climate-controlled area and space for kiosks and 11 restaurants of exotic Pakistani and foreign food and a variety of beverages.  To attract more people, the management has also started offering speedboat rides that take passengers along China Creek. The riders can also see the mangroves planted there, but do not actually pass through them. The management also hopes that the speedboat rides will help people understand the need to protect mangroves and reduce marine pollution.

Gallery

References

Entertainment districts in Pakistan
Cuisine of Karachi
Culture of Karachi
Tourist attractions in Karachi
Restaurant districts and streets in Pakistan
Waterfronts